Lovelace v Ontario, [2000] 1 S.C.R. 950, 2000 SCC 37, was the leading decision by the Supreme Court of Canada on section 15(2) of the Charter, which shields affirmative action programs from the equality requirement of section 15(1). The Court decided that distribution of casino profits to a select group of aboriginals is not discriminatory. The leading case on section 15(2) is now R. v. Kapp, 2008 SCC 41.

Background 
In a deal made in the early 1990s, the Ontario government gave control of reserve-based gaming activities to several First Nations bands. By 1996 the government enacted the First Nations Fund, which restricts the distribution of the profits from the on-reserve casinos to First Nation bands registered under the Indian Act.

The petitioners were a group of non-registered First Nations bands who were status Indians. They claimed that they were discriminated against by the government under section 15(1) of the Charter. 

The Court of Appeal for Ontario ruled against the First Nations bands. The Court ruled that an exception under section 15(2) could be made for any discrimination claims as the purpose of the law was to improve the social and economic conditions of the registered bands.

Opinion of the Court 
The unanimous Court decisions was given by Iacobucci J. in which he ruled that the claimants failed to establish that the purpose of the First Nations Fund was based on a stereotype. There was a clearly established ameliorative purpose to the fund that did not coincide with the claimants' needs and circumstances. 

Iacobucci further examined the purpose of section 15(2). He described it as "confirmatory and supplementary" to section 15 jurisprudence. That is, the section must not be applied separately from section 15(1); rather, it should be used as a guide when analysing claims under section 15(1). Nevertheless, he left open the possibility of different applications of section 15(2) for future cases.

External links
 

Supreme Court of Canada cases
Section Fifteen Charter case law
Labour relations in Canada
2000 in Canadian case law